Chilkat or The Chilkat, or Chilkats, may refer to:

Chilkat tribe and related uses 

 Chilkat Tlingit, a tribe found on the Chilkat River and on Chilkat Peninsula
 Chilkat Reservation, a U.S. Indian Reservation in Alaska, see List of Indian reservations in the United States
 Chilkat weaving, a traditional form of weaving practiced by Tlingit, Haida, Tsimshian, and other Northwest Coast peoples of Alaska and British Columbia.
 Chilkat blanket, a type of blanket which uses Chilkat weaving

In geography 

 Chilkat Range or Chilkat Mountains, a mountain range in Haines Borough, Alaska, USA
 Chilkat Pass, a mountain pass between BC, Canada and Alaska, USA over the Coast Mountains, lying on the Dalton Trail and Haines Highway
 Chilkat Trail or Dalton Trail, a Klondike Gold Rush Trail between coastal Alaska and the goldfields in the Yukon
 Chilkat Peninsula, a peninsula in southeast Alaska that divides the Chilkat Inlet from the Chilkoot Inlet
 Chilkat Inlet, the terminus of the Chilkat River, in Alaska
 Chilkat River, a river originating from the Chilkat Glacier in BC, Canada, and flowing into Chilkat Inlet in Alaska, USA
 Chilkat Valley, a river valley in Alaska in Haines Borough, of the Chilkat River
 Chilkat Glacier, British Columbia, Canada; the source of the Chilkat River
 Chilkat Lake, a lake in Haines, Alaska, see List of lakes of Alaska
 Chilkat Islands, islands of Alaska, see List of islands of Alaska

Other uses 

 , a ferry, part of the Alaska Marine Highway
 USS Chilkat, a U.S. Navy ship, see List of United States Navy ships: C
 Chilkat Oil Company Refinery Site
 Chilkat Valley News

See also
 Chilkoot (disambiguation)